Borets is a village in Southern Bulgaria, in Brezovo Municipality, Plovdiv Province. The population of the town is 699 people as of 2020.

Geography 
Borets village is located 37 kilometers North East of Plovdiv and 16 kilometers West of Brezovo and 14 kilometers North West of Rakovski (town). The village's terrain is plane and has an average altitude of 200 meters above sea level. The climate in the area is soft and moderate. During the winter months the average temperature is around 0ºС, while during the summer it averages around 26ºС. In the area of Brezovo municipality there are 82 dams which makes the area a good place for water sports and water tourism.

Pavel Banya, a mineral springs touristic town is located around 57 kilometers North-East of the village.

Culture and infrastructure 
Borets has a good infrastructure with electricity and a source of water, a well-functioning sewage, and an access to internet, television and telephone lines. There is a community center with a library in the village and a Catholic church, located closely to the local school.

Notable people 

 Bozhana Zlatanova, a Bulgarian Hero of Socialist labour. 
 Vasil Pramatarski, (1883 - ?) which was an active member of VMORO, and a participant in the Dimitar Tashev's war party.

Public institutions 

 School "Sv. Sv. Kiril i Metodii", which in 2004 became 120 years old. The first ever school teacher to take part of the school was Nikola Ivanov Kibarski.
 Community Hall and library "Luch", which is entitled to organize cultural events in the village.
 Two Christian temples, a Catholic church "Sveti Anton" and an Orthodox churc "Sv. sv Kiril i Metodii"

References 

Villages in Plovdiv Province